Schmidly's deer mouse (Peromyscus schmidlyi), is a recently described species of deer mouse from the mountains of western Mexico. It is part of the highly complex and well-studied Peromyscus boylii species complex.  The uniqueness of Peromyscus from this area had long been suspected, but was only formalized in 2004 with the publication of its species description.  The species was named in honor of David J. Schmidly, a mammalogist and former president of the University of New Mexico.

The name "Schmidly's deer mouse" is ambiguous, as it is shared by another species, Habromys schmidlyi.

Description
P. schmidlyi, or Schmidly's deermouse, is a typical deer mouse, and can only be reliably distinguished from other members of its species group by DNA analysis.

The fur is reddish umber over most of the body, becoming almost white on the under parts. The feet have a grey stripe extending past the ankle, and white toes. The tail is dark and bears only coarse, sparse hair, except for a tuft at the tip. It is similar in appearance to the nimble-footed mouse, but is usually larger and darker in color.

Like all deermice, P. schmidlyli has 16 total teeth (i 1/1, c 0/0, p 0/0, m 3/3), and the males have scrotal testes.

Detailed parameters

The dilated body description is shown below.

Genetics
Its monophyly has been confirmed using parsimony, maximum likelihood, and Bayesian analysis of the mitochondrial cytochrome b gene.  The species also differs from other Peromyscus in having the karyotype (FN = 54-56). Its closest relative appears to be Peromyscus levipes.

Distribution and habitat
The species is found in the states of Sinaloa, Sonora and Durango in the Sierra Madre Occidental of Mexico. Like many other members of the P. boylii species group, it is found only at higher elevations, above .  It is known to inhabit deep gullies and rocky hillsides in pine-oak forests.

The dominant vegetation of these areas consists of pointleaf manzanita, kittle lemonhead, one-seeded jumper, Apache, Ponderosa, and Yecora pine, Arizona white oak, sipuri, and silverleaf oak. The annual vegetation is six-week threeawn, spidergrass, common oats, and needle grams.

Disease 
Like all deermice, P. schmidlyi can be a host for viruses and bacteria, and a vector for disease.

References

Peromyscus
Mammals described in 2004